Dashbulag may refer to:
Dambulaq, Azerbaijan
Daşbulaq (disambiguation), Azerbaijan